Rattihalli Nagendra Rao Krishna Prasad (c. 1929 – 15 February 2012) was an Indian cinematographer, actor, director and producer. He was the eldest son of R. Nagendra Rao considered one of the foremost figures of Kannada cinema.

Career 
Born in 1929 in Mysore, Krishna Prasad directed the Kannada film Naguva Hoovu starring his younger brother R. N. Sudarshan in the lead. Krishna Prasad won the Karnataka State Award for cinematography three times.

In his later years, Krishna Prasad acted in Tamil films playing an important supporting role in Michael Madana Kama Rajan (1990) along with his brother R. N. Jayagopal. Krishna Prasad also acted in the Tamil television serial Marmadesam.

Filmography

As a cinematographer
Premada Putri (1957)
Vijayanagarada Veeraputhra (1961)
Naandi (1964)
Belli Moda (1967)
Naguva Hoovu (1971; also director)
Bhale Adrushtavo Adrushta (1971)
Kesarina Kamala (1973)
Mareyada Haadu (1981)
Avala Antharanga (1984)

As an actor
Films
All films are in Tamil, unless otherwise noted.

Television

Awards and nominations 
1967–68 Karnataka State Film Awards: Best Cinematographer - Belli Moda (won)
1980–81 Karnataka State Film Awards: Best Cinematographer - Mareyada Haadu (won)
1984–85 Karnataka State Film Awards: Best Cinematographer - Avala Antharanga (won)

References 

1929 births
2012 deaths
Cinematographers from Karnataka
Kannada film directors
Artists from Mysore
Film producers from Karnataka
Kannada film cinematographers
Film directors from Karnataka
20th-century Indian photographers
Tamil male television actors